Picton was launched in 1815 at Bristol. She made three voyages to the West Indies and one to St. Petersburg. Her first master was Charles Mountstephens. She enters Lloyd's Register  in 1816 with Mountstevens as master and trade London-Jamaica.

Then on 27 January 1817 John Morris replaced Mountstephens, shortly after her change of ownership. Picton, Morris, master, was outbound on a voyage to Barbados when she wrecked on Foreland Point between Minehead and Ilfracombe during a storm on 20 January 1820. Two crewmen died of exposure but a woman passenger and the rest of the crew were saved. (The same storm claimed a number of other vessels.)

Citations

References
Farr, Grahame E., ed. (1950) Records of Bristol Ships, 1800-1838 (vessels over 150 tons). (Bristol Record Society), Vol. 15, p. 60.

1815 ships
Ships built in Bristol
Age of Sail merchant ships
Merchant ships of the United Kingdom
Maritime incidents in January 1820